Bjarke Pauli Mogensen (born 27 December 1985 in Ronne) is a Danish accordionist.  He began learning the accordion at age 7.

At age 13, Mogensen made his debut as a soloist in a German TV broadcast with the Munich Symphony Orchestra.  Mogensen studied at the Royal Danish Academy of Music, where his teachers included Geir Draugsvoll.

In 2008, he received a grant of 300,000 DKr from the Statens Kunstråds Musikudvalg (Danish Arts Council Music Committee) in support of his career.  In addition to his solo career, Mogensen has served on the music faculty at the Royal Danish Academy of Music since 2010.  In 2011, Mogensen had his solo debut at Carnegie Hall, New York.

Several composers have written new works for Mogensen, including Anders Koppel (Concerto Piccolo), Martin Lohse (In Liquid), and Niklas Schmidt (Concertino for accordion and brass).  Mogensen has recorded commercially for the Da Capo label, including the commissions from Koppel and Lohse.

Prizes
 Almere International Chamber Music Competition 2012 with MYTHOS
 EBU competition "New Talent" 2012
 Danish Radio P2's Chamber Music Competition 2011 with MYTHOS
 Léonie Sonning Music Scholarship 2010
 Gladsaxe Music Prize 2009
 The Royal Danish Academy of Musics competition for singers and instrumentalists 2008
 Danish Radio "Play for Life" 2006
 Culture Bornholm Culture Award 2006
 Victor Borge Music Prize 2006
 Berlingske Classical Music Competition 2000

Grants and scholarships 
 Eigil and Aennchen Harbys Fund 2011
 His Royal Highness Prince Henrik Foundation Grant
 Børge Schroeder and his wife Herta Finnerups Music Scholarship 2001
 Jacob Gade Grant 2000

Releases
 Accordion Concertos on Dacapo Records
 The song I'll never sing - Works for Accordion on Dacapo Records
 Anders Koppel Double Concertos on Dacapo Records
 Winter Sketches on Orchid Classics

References

External links
 Official homepage of Bjarke Mogensens
 Det Kongelige Danske Musikkonservatorium, Danish-language page on Mogensen
 Almere International Chamber Music Competition - winners

Living people
1985 births
Danish classical musicians
Royal Danish Academy of Music alumni
21st-century accordionists